Panchali refers to Draupadi, the wife of the Pandavas in the Sanskrit epic Mahabharata.

Panchali may also refer to:
 Panchali (narrative form), a form of narrative folk or religious songs or stories in the Bengal region
 The Barhai, also known as Panchali, are Hindu caste, found in North India
 Panchali language
 Panchaali, a 1959 film